Nueva Esparta (Spanish for "New Sparta") may refer to:

Nueva Esparta, one of the States of Venezuela
Nueva Esparta, El Salvador, a municipality in El Salvador
Nueva Esparta class destroyer, a class of destroyers of the Venezuelan navy
ARV Nueva Esparta (D-11), a ship of Nueva Esparta class